The Perpetual Edict of 12 July 1611 was a decree of the Archdukes Albert and Isabella governing legal process in the Southern Netherlands. It consisted of 47 clauses laying out the basic rules of criminal and civil procedure. It was printed in both Dutch and French by Rutger Velpius, printer to the court. The edict had a fundamental impact on the codification of customary law, which it did much to encourage. It also placed a legal obligation on parish churches to register births, marriages and deaths (alongside the existing ecclesiastical legislation to that effect), and on local magistrates to ensure that the secular authorities obtained a copy of such registers each year (a stipulation apparently only applied in the city of Mechelen).

Studies
 Antonius Anselmo, Commentaria ad perpetuum edictum serenissimorum Belgii principum Alberti et Isabellae evulgatum 12. Iulii. M.DC.XI (Antwerp: Petrus Bellerus, 1656), available on Google Books; 2nd edition 1664 (on Google Books); 3rd edition 1701 (on Google Books)
 Georges Martyn, Het Eeuwig Edict van 12 juli 1611: Zijn genese en zijn rol in de verschriftelijking van het privaatrecht (Brussels: Algemeen Rijksarchief, 2000).

References

External links
 Transcription of the Dutch edition, on the website of Katholieke Universiteit Leuven Kulak. Undated. Accessed 26 January 2015.
 Scan of the Dutch edition on Google Books, from Ghent University Library.
 Scan of the French edition on Google Books, from Ghent University Library.

1611 in law
1611 in the Habsburg Netherlands
Legal history of Belgium

nl:Eeuwig Edict (1611)
fr:%C3%89dit perp%C3%A9tuel (1611)